Lorela Cubaj (born January 8, 1999) is an Italian professional basketball player, who play currently in Umana Reyer Venezia at the Lega Basket Femminile. She played college basketball at Georgia Tech. She was drafted by the Seattle Storm in the 2022 WNBA draft and played for the New York Liberty in the WNBA. She was waived by the team during her rookie season on July 1, 2022 after playing 11 games.

Playing career

Early years
Cubaj started play basketball when she was 8. She won the Italian U18 championship with Umana Reyer Venezia in 2016–17 season.

College career
Cubaj signed with Georgia Tech the summer of 2017. She made NCAA Tournament Sweet Sixteen with the Yellow Jackets in 2021, where they were defeated by South Carolina. That match Cubaj scored 15 points and grabbed 7 rebounds.

Professional career
On April 11, 2022, Cubaj was drafted 18th overall by the Seattle Storm in the 2022 WNBA draft and they trade her draft rights to New York immediately. Cubaj played in 11 games for the Liberty during her rookie season before being waived on July 1, 2022. On 15 June 2022 Cubaj was signed to Umana Reyer Venezia for the 2022–23 LBF season.

WNBA career statistics

Regular Season

|-
| align="left" | 2022
| align="left" | New York
| 11 || 0 || 8.0 || .333 || .000 || .000 || 2.1 || 0.4 || 0.0 || 0.2 || 0.5 || 0.7
|-
| align="left" | Career
| align="left" | 1 year, 1 team
| 11 || 0 || 8.0 || .333 || .000 || .000 || 2.1 || 0.4 || 0.0 || 0.2 || 0.5 || 0.7

National Team

Youth level
Cubaj won bronze medal with Italian team at the U16 European Championship in 2015, she has averaged 11 points and 6.6 rebounds and voted to the tournament All-Star Five. One year later she won silver medal with the Italian U17 team, at the 2016 U17 World Championship in Spain. They lost the final against Australia. At the tournament Cubaj averaged 6.1 points and 5.4 rebounds. Few weeks later, she was part of the Italian U18 national team at the U18 European Championship in Hungary and finished seventh place. At the tournament Cubaj averaged 10.4 points and 7.3 rebounds.

References

External links
Georgia Tech Yellow Jackets bio

1999 births
Living people
Italian women's basketball players
Forwards (basketball)
Georgia Tech Yellow Jackets women's basketball players
Sportspeople from Perugia
Seattle Storm draft picks
New York Liberty players